The 2016 BNP Paribas de Nouvelle-Calédonie was a professional tennis tournament played on hard courts. It was the thirteenth edition of the tournament which was part of the 2016 ATP Challenger Tour. It took place in Nouméa, New Caledonia on 4–9 January 2016.

Singles main-draw entrants

Seeds

 1 Rankings are as of December 28, 2015.

Other entrants
The following players received wildcards into the singles main draw:
  Adrian Mannarino
  Maxime Janvier
  Nicolas N'Godrela
  Julien Benneteau

The following players received entry from the qualifying draw:
  Isaac Frost
  Maximilian Marterer
  Stefano Napolitano
  Florian Reynet

Champions

Singles

 Adrian Mannarino def.  Alejandro Falla 5–7, 6–2, 6–2

Doubles

 Julien Benneteau /  Édouard Roger-Vasselin def.  Grégoire Barrère /  Tristan Lamasine 7–6(7–4), 3–6, [10–5]

External links
Official Website

BNP Paribas de Nouvelle-Caledonie
Internationaux de Nouvelle-Calédonie
Inter
2016 in French tennis